Kumbakonam Municipal Corporation is the civic body governing city of Kumbakonam in the Indian state of Tamil Nadu. Municipal Corporation mechanism in India was introduced during British Rule with formation of municipal corporation in Madras (Chennai) in 1688, later followed by municipal corporations in Bombay (Mumbai) and Calcutta (Kolkata) by 1762. Kumbakonam Municipal Corporation is headed by Mayor of city and governed by Commissioner.

History and administration 

Kumbakonam Municipal Corporation in Thanjavur district was formed on 20 December 2021 and is the 21st municipal corporation of Tamil Nadu.  Kumbakonam Municipal Corporation will include Darasuram town panchayat and 13 panchayats adjacent to the place. The place is driven spiritually through many important temples.

Kumbakonam Municipal Corporation has a Commissioner, a Mayor, a Council, a Standing Committee, and a Wards Committee for facilitating various works.

Factors driving Kumbakonam Municipal Corporation 

Kumbakonam Municipal Corporation is driven by following factors:

  Population Growth.
  Increase in annual Income.
  Improvement of Roads.
  Providing drinking water.
  Improving landscape.
  Improving employment opportunities.
  Improving relations between police and public.
  Waste management.
  Arranging facilities during natural calamities.
  Establishing industrial units.
  Providing sewage connection.
  Clean Sanitation.

Kumbakonam Municipal Corporation local body polls 
Kumbakonam Municipal Corporation will get a mayor and municipal council through local body polls.

See also 
 List of municipal corporations in India

References

External links 
 official website

Municipal corporations in Tamil Nadu
Kumbakonam